Vivimos en una estrella is a Mexican telenovela produced by Televisa for Telesistema Mexicano in 1963.

Cast 
 Beatriz Aguirre
 Magda Donato
 María Rojo
 Rafael Bertrand
 Antonio Gama
 Fernando Mendoza
 Alberto Galán
 Carlos Becerril

References

External links 

Mexican telenovelas
1963 telenovelas
Televisa telenovelas
1963 Mexican television series debuts
1963 Mexican television series endings
Spanish-language telenovelas